Tore Navrestad (born ) is a Norwegian male  BMX rider, representing his nation at international competitions. He competed in the time trial event at the 2015 UCI BMX World Championships.

References

External links
 
 
 
 
 
 

1996 births
Living people
BMX riders
Norwegian male cyclists
Olympic cyclists of Norway
Cyclists at the 2016 Summer Olympics
Cyclists at the 2020 Summer Olympics
European Games competitors for Norway
Cyclists at the 2015 European Games
Cyclists from Oslo
21st-century Norwegian people